Duke Zhuang II of Qi (died 548 BC) was from 553 to 548 BC ruler of the State of Qi, a major power during the Spring and Autumn period of ancient China.  His personal name was Lü Guāng (呂光), ancestral name Jiang (姜), and Duke Zhuang was his posthumous title.  He was the second of the two Qi rulers called Duke Zhuang.  Before ascending the throne he was known as Prince Guang.

Accession to the throne
Prince Guang was the son of Duke Ling of Qi and his concubine Sheng Ji.  In 572 BC Duke Dao of the state of Jin attacked Qi.  Duke Ling made peace with Jin by sending Prince Guang to Jin as a hostage.

In 563 BC, Guang was made the crown prince of Qi. However, Duke Ling later deposed him and made his half-brother Ya the new crown prince, at the request of his favorite concubine Rong Zi. In the fifth month of 554 BC, Duke Ling died after 28 years of reign, and the powerful minister Cui Zhu installed Guang on the throne instead of the new crown prince Ya.  Prince Guang is posthumously known as Duke Zhuang II of Qi.  Cui Zhu and Duke Zhuang subsequently killed Rong Zi, Prince Ya, and minister Gao Hou, who supported Ya.

Battles with Jin
In 551 BC, Luan Ying, leader of the powerful Luan Clan of the State of Jin, rebelled against Jin, but was defeated and fled to Qi. Minister Yan Ying advised Duke Zhuang against supporting rebels of Jin, to no avail. The next year, with Duke Zhuang's support, Luan secretly returned to Quwo, the old Jin capital, and rebelled again. Meanwhile, Duke Zhuang dispatched the Qi army to invade Jin, reaching the Taihang Mountains. Luan achieved some initial success, and even briefly captured the Jin capital, Jiang.  However, he was soon defeated by the Jin army and killed at Quwo. After hearing of Luan's defeat, the Qi forces retreated, taking the city of Zhaoge on the way back.  Two years later, Jin attacked Qi for revenge.

Death
Duke Zhuang had an adulterous relationship with Cui Zhu's second wife Tang Jiang, which Cui learned about.  In the fifth month of 548 BC, the viscount of the minor state of Ju came to pay tribute to Qi.  Cui pretended to be ill and did not attend the banquet for the Viscount of Ju.

The next day, Duke Zhuang visited Cui at his home and tried to have a tryst with his wife. Cui had his men block the Duke's guards outside and surround Duke Zhuang in the courtyard. Duke Zhuang tried to escape by climbing a wall, but was shot by an arrow and killed.  Cui Zhu subsequently installed Duke Zhuang's younger half-brother Chujiu on the throne, to be known as Duke Jing of Qi.

Family
Daughters:
 Shao Jiang
 Married Duke Ping of Jin (d. 532 BC)

Ancestry

References

Year of birth unknown
Monarchs of Qi (state)
6th-century BC Chinese monarchs
548 BC deaths
6th-century BC murdered monarchs
Assassinated Chinese politicians